Arusha Airport  is a domestic airport located in the city of Arusha, the capital of the Arusha Region of Tanzania. The airport is currently undergoing an expansion, which includes a new apron and terminal building.

The Arusha non-directional beacon (Ident: AR) is located at the west end of the field.

Airlines and destinations

Arusha airport is served by six airlines at the moment. Table below as follows:

Statistics

Accidents and incidents
 On 18 December 2013, an Ethiopian Airlines Boeing 767 (ET-AQW) flight from Addis Ababa to Kilimanjaro International Airport made an unscheduled landing at the airport after it failed to land at its destination. The runway is shorter than the 767 is normally able to operate from. Consequently, it overran the end of the runway which resulted in the airport being closed for a short time. A few days later it was flown  empty to Kilimanjaro International Airport.

See also

List of airports in Tanzania
Transport in Tanzania

References

External links

OpenStreetMap - Arusha
OurAirports - Arusha
General airport information

Airports in Tanzania
Buildings and structures in the Arusha Region